LiveS  The Reunion Concerts 1994 is a live album by English progressive jazz-rock band Colosseum. It includes two tracks from their reunion concert at the Zelt-Musik-Festival in Freiburg, Germany and six tracks from the second reunion concert at the E-Werk in Cologne, Germany.

In 2003 Live Cologne 1994 was released, which contains the rest of the titles played in Reunion Concerts 1994 in Cologne.

In the same year a DVD with the complete Cologne concert was released under the title The Complete Reunion Concert Cologne 1994 (including a 90-minute documentary The Story of Colosseum).

Track listing

LiveS  The Reunion Concerts 1994 
 "Those About to Die ..." (Greenslade, Heckstall-Smith, Hiseman, Reeves) — 5:06 *
 "Elegy" (James Litherland) — 4:17
 "The Valentyne Suite": (Colosseum) — 20:41
 "January's Search" (Greenslade, Hiseman) — 5:38
 "February's Valentyne" (Greenslade, Hiseman) — 5:16
 "The Grass Is Always Greener" (Heckstall-Smith, Hiseman) — 9:47
 "Theme for an Imaginary Western" (Pete Brown, Jack Bruce) — 6:30
 "The Machine Demands Another Sacrifice" (James Litherland) — 2:02
 "Solo Colonia" (Hiseman) — 12:27
 "Lost Angeles" (Greenslade, Heckstall-Smith, Farlowe) — 13:22
 "Stormy Monday Blues" (T-Bone Walker) — 12:11 *

* live at Zelt-Musik-Festival, Freiburg, Germany, June 24, 1994.

Live Cologne 1994 
 "Those About to Die" (Tony Reeves) — 5:22
 "Skelington" (Clempson, Hiseman) — 12:24
 "Tanglewood '63" (Mike Gibbs) — 10:54
 "Rope Ladder To The Moon" (Bruce, Brown) — 9:41
 "Stormy Monday Blues" (T-Bone Walker) — 5:27
 "Walking In The Park" (Graham Bond) — 6:36

Personnel 
Colosseum
 Mark Clarke - bass guitar, vocals
 Dave "Clem" Clempson - guitars, vocals
 Chris Farlowe - vocals
 Dave Greenslade - keyboards EMU Proteus 2 & Roland U20, Hammond organ, vibraphone, vocals
 Dick Heckstall-Smith - saxophones
 Jon Hiseman - drums, percussion, cymbals

References 

Colosseum (band) live albums
1994 live albums
2004 live albums